Rosemary Langford (née Teele) is a lawyer, writer and academic from Australia.

Langford grew up in Melbourne and attended Presbyterian Ladies' College, Melbourne. She has a first class honours degree in Law (as well as a Bachelor of Arts majoring in French and German) from the University of Melbourne and a PhD from Monash University. In 1996 Langford was awarded a Rhodes Scholarship. On graduating she worked as a lawyer with Allens Arthur Robinson (now Allens Linklaters) and later became a lecturer in law at the University of Melbourne Law School. She is also a barrister and solicitor at the Supreme Court of Victoria.

Langford is an active member of the Corporations Committee of the Business Law Section of the Law Council of Australia, as well as the Not for Profit Law Committee of the Law Council of Australia. She also edits the Directors' Duties Section of the Company & Securities Law Journal.

Publications 

 Directors’ Duties: Principles and Application (2014), Federation Press
Company Directors’ Duties and Conflicts of Interest (Oxford University Press, 2019)

References

Living people
Year of birth missing (living people)
21st-century Australian lawyers
Lawyers from Melbourne
University of Melbourne alumni
Monash University alumni
Australian Rhodes Scholars